The Somerset Wind Farm is a wind farm in Somerset County, Pennsylvania with six GE 1.5 MW Wind Turbines that began commercial operation in October 2001. The wind farm has a combined total nameplate capacity of 9 MW, and produces about 25,000 megawatt-hours of electricity annually, which is roughly a 30% capacity factor. The wind farm was constructed by NextEra Energy Resources, based in Florida.

The wind farm is just one-half mile south of the Pennsylvania Turnpike, which makes its  towers easily visible to turnpike travelers.

Gallery

See also 

Wind power in Pennsylvania

References

External links
 Wind Powering America on DoE website
 GE Wind 1.5 MW Series Wind Turbine

Energy infrastructure completed in 2001
Buildings and structures in Somerset County, Pennsylvania
Wind farms in Pennsylvania
NextEra Energy